Robert Malcolm Ward "Bob" Dixon (born 25 January 1939, in Gloucester, England) is a Professor of Linguistics in the College of Arts, Society, and Education and The Cairns Institute, James Cook University, Queensland. He is also Deputy Director of The Language and Culture Research Centre at JCU. Doctor of Letters (DLitt, ANU, 1991), he was awarded an Honorary Doctor of Letters Honoris Causa by JCU in 2018. Fellow of British Academy; Fellow of the Australian Academy of the Humanities, and Honorary member of the Linguistic Society of America, he is one of three living linguists to be specifically mentioned in The Concise Oxford Dictionary of Linguistics by Peter Matthews (2014).

Early life
Dixon was born in Gloucester, in the west of England, in 1939 and as a child lived at Stroud and later at Bramcote near Nottingham, where his father became principal of the People's College of Further Education. He was educated at Nottingham High School and then at the University of Oxford, where he took his first degree in mathematics in 1960, and finally at the University of Edinburgh, where he was a Research Fellow in Statistical Linguistics in the English department from July 1961 to September 1963. After that until September 1964 he did field work for the Australian Institute of Aboriginal Studies in north-east Queensland, working on several of the Aboriginal languages of Australia, but taking a particular interest in Dyirbal.

Career

Research
Dixon has written on many areas of linguistic theory and fieldwork, being particularly noted for his work on the languages of Australia and the Arawá languages of Brazil. He has published grammars of Dyirbal, Yidiɲ, Warrgamay, Nyawaygi, and Mbabaram. He published a comprehensive grammar of Boumaa Fijian, a Polynesian language (1988), and Jarawara, an Arawá language from southern Amazonia (2004), for which he received the Leonard Bloomfield Book Award from the Linguistic Society of America.

Dixon's work in historical linguistics has been highly influential. Based on a careful historical comparative analysis, Dixon questions the concept of Pama–Nyungan languages, for which he argues sufficient evidence has never been provided. He also proposes a new "punctuated equilibrium" model, based on the theory of the same name in evolutionary biology, which is more appropriate for numerous language regions, including the Australian languages. Dixon puts forth his theory in The Rise and Fall of Languages, refined in his monograph Australian Languages: their nature and development (2002). Dixon is the author of a number of other books, including Australian Languages: Their Nature and Development and Ergativity. His monumental three-volume work Basic Linguistic Theory (2010–2012) was published by the Oxford University Press.

His further work on Australian languages was published in Edible gender, mother-in-law style, and other grammatical wonders: Studies in Dyirbal, Yidiñ and Warrgamay, 2015.

His further influential monographs include work on English grammar, especially A new approach to English grammar (1991, revised edition 2005), and Making New Words: Morphological Derivation in English (2014). His recent monograph Are Some Languages Better than Others (2016, paperback 2018) poses a question of efficiency and value of different languages.

His editorial work includes four volumes of Handbook of Australian Languages (with Barry Blake), a special issue of Lingua on ergativity, and, jointly with Alexandra Aikhenvald, numerous volumes on linguistic typology in the series Explorations in Linguistic Typology, the fundamental The Amazonian languages (1999), and The Cambridge Handbook of Linguistic Typology (2017).

His most recent book is The Unmasking of English Dictionaries (2018), which offers a concise history of English dictionaries unmasking their drawbacks, and suggests a new innovative way of dictionary making.

His "We used to eat people", Revelations of a Fiji islands traditional village (2018) offers a vivid portrayal of his fieldwork in Fiji in the late 1980s.

Academic positions
In 1996, Dixon and another linguist, Alexandra Aikhenvald, established the Research Centre for Linguistic Typology at the Australian National University in Canberra. On 1 January 2000, the centre moved to La Trobe University in Melbourne.

Both Dixon (the director of the centre) and Aikhenvald (its associate director) resigned their positions in May 2008. In early 2009, Aikhenvald and Dixon established the Language and Culture Research Group (LCRG) at the Cairns campus of James Cook University. This has been transformed into a Language and Culture Research Centre within the Faculty of Arts and Social Sciences at JCU, Cairns, in 2011. Currently, Aikhenvald is director and Dixon deputy director of the centre.

Bibliography
(The list below is incomplete.)

As author or coauthor
 Linguistic Science and Logic. Janua linguarum. Studia memoriae Nicolai Van Wijk dedicata, series minor, 28. The Hague: Mouton, 1963. 
 Blues and Gospel Records, 1902–1943. With William John Godrich.
1st ed. Harrow: Steve Lane, 1964. .
2nd ed. London: Storyville, 1969. .
3rd ed. Essex: Storyville Publications, 1982. .
 Blues and Gospel Records: 1890–1943. With John Godrich and Howard Rye. 
4th ed. Oxford: Oxford University Press, 1997. .
 What Is Language? A New Approach to Linguistic Description. London: Longmans, Green, 1966. .
 How to Understand Aliens. In: Worlds of Tomorrow, January 1966, pp. 115–122.
 Alien Arithmetic. In: Worlds of Tomorrow, May 1966, pp. 113–119.
 Recording the Blues. With John Godrich. New York: Stein and Day, 1970. , . London: Studio Vista, 1970. , .
 The Dyirbal Language of North Queensland. Cambridge Studies in Linguistics 9. Cambridge: Cambridge University Press, 1972. , . . Online .
 Grammatical categories in Australian languages. Canberra: Australian Institute of Aboriginal Studies; [Atlantic Highlands, NJ]: Humanities Press, 1976.
 A Grammar of Yidiɲ. Cambridge Studies in Linguistics 19. Cambridge: Cambridge University Press, 1977. , . Reprinted 2010. . . Online .
 The Languages of Australia. Cambridge Language Surveys. Cambridge: Cambridge University Press, 1980. , . Cambridge Library Collection. Cambridge: Cambridge University Press, 2011. . . Online .
 Where Have All the Adjectives Gone? and Other Essays in Semantics and Syntax. Janua Linguarum, Series maior, 107. Berlin: Mouton, 1982. .
 Studies in Ergativity. Amsterdam: North-Holland, 1987. .
 A Grammar of Boumaa Fijian. Chicago: University of Chicago Press, 1988. , .
 Australian Aboriginal Words in English: Their Origin and Meaning. 
 With W. S. Ramson and Mandy Thomas. Oxford: Oxford University Press, 1991. . 1992. . 
 2nd ed. With Bruce Moore, W. S. Ramson and Mandy Thomas. Oxford: Oxford University Press, 2007. .
A New Approach to English Grammar, on Semantic Principles. Oxford: Clarendon Press, 1991. Hardback 0198242727, paperback .
A Semantic Approach to English Grammar. Oxford Textbooks in Linguistics. New York: Oxford University Press, 2005. Revised edition. Hardback , paperback .
英语语义语法 = A Semantic Approach to English Grammar. Beijing, 2016. . The English text, with a short additional text in Chinese.
 Searching for Aboriginal Languages: Memoirs of a Field Worker. St Lucia: University of Queensland Press, 1984. Hardback , paperback }. Chicago: University of Chicago Press, 1989. . Cambridge Library Collection. Cambridge: Cambridge University Press, 2011. . Paperback , online . A memoir of Dixon's early fieldwork in Australia. The book provides a glimpse at linguistic fieldwork as it was done in that era, as well as a look at the appalling treatment of Aboriginal peoples of Australia that continued right into the 1960s.
 Ergativity. Cambridge Studies in Linguistics 69. Cambridge: Cambridge University Press, 1994. . Hardback , paperback . Online . 
 Dyirbal Song Poetry: The Oral Literature of an Australian Rainforest People. With Grace Koch. St Lucia: University of Queensland Press, 1996. . Accompanied by a CD, .
 The Rise and Fall of Languages. Cambridge: Cambridge University Press, 1997. Hardback , paperback . Cambridge: Cambridge University Press, 2006. . . Online .
 . Iwanami Shinsho. Tokyo: Iwanami Shoten, 2001.  Japanese translation.
 語言的興衰. Taipei, 2014. . Chinese translation. 
 Changing Valency: Case Studies in Transitivity. With A. Y. Aikhenvald. Cambridge: Cambridge University Press, 2000. . Hardback , paperback , online .
 The Jarawara language of Southern Amazonia. Oxford: Oxford University Press, 2004. Hardback , paperback .
 Australian Languages: Their Nature and Development. Cambridge Language Surveys. Cambridge: Cambridge University Press, 2002. . Hardback , paperback , online .
 Basic Linguistic Theory. Oxford: Oxford University Press.
 Vol 1, Methodology. 2009. Hardback , paperback .
 Vol 2, Grammatical Topics. 2009. Hardback , paperback .
 Vol 3, Further Grammatical Topics. 2012. Hardback , paperback .
 I Am a Linguist. Leiden: Brill, 2011. Hardback , paperback . An autobiography.
 Language at Large: Essays on Syntax and Semantics. With A. Y. Aikhenvald. Empirical Approaches to Linguistic Theory 2. Leiden: Brill, 2011. . 2018. .
 Making New Words: Morphological Derivation in English. Oxford: Oxford University Press, 2014. Hardback , paperback .
 Edible Gender, Mother-in-Law Style, and Other Grammatical Wonders: Studies in Dyirbal, Yidiñ and Warrgamay. Oxford: Oxford University Press, 2015. .
 Are Some Languages Better than Others? Oxford: Oxford University Press, 2016. Hardback , paperback .
 "We used to eat people": Revelations of a Fiji Islands Traditional Village. Jefferson, NC: McFarland, 2017. .
 The Unmasking of English Dictionaries. Cambridge: Cambridge University Press, 2018. . Online .
 Australia's Original Languages: An Introduction. Crows Nest, NSW: Allen & Unwin, 2019. .

As editor or coeditor
 R. M. W. Dixon and Barry J. Blake, eds. Handbook of Australian Languages.
 Vol 1. (Guugu Yimidhirr. Pitta-Pitta. Gumbaynggir. Yaygir.) Canberra: Australian National University Press, 1979. . Amsterdam: John Benjamins, 1979. .
 Vol 2. (Wargamay, The Mpakwithi dialect of Anguthimri; Watjarri. Margany and Gunya, Tasmanian.) Canberra: Australian National University Press, 1981. . Amsterdam: John Benjamins, 1981. .
 Vol 3. (Djapu, a Yolngu dialect. Yukulta. Uradhi. Nyawaygi.) Canberra: Australian National University Press, 1983. . Amsterdam: John Benjamins, 1983 . 
 Vol 4, The aboriginal language of Melbourne and other grammatical sketches. South Melbourne: Oxford University Press, 1991. .
 Vol 5, Grammatical sketches of Bunuba, Ndjébbana and Kugu Nganhcara. South Melbourne: Oxford University Press, 2000. .
 The Honey-Ant Men's Love Song and Other Aboriginal Song Poems (UQP Poetry), 1990
 Words of our country: Stories, place names, and vocabulary in Yidiny, the Aboriginal Language of the Cairns-Yarrabah Region (Editor), 1991. 
 The Amazonian Languages (Editor with A. Y. Aikhenvald), 1999
 Areal Diffusion and Genetic Inheritance: Problems in Comparative Linguistics (Editor with A. Y. Aikhenvald), 2002
 Word: A Cross-linguistic Typology. Editor with A. Y. Aikhenvald. Cambridge: Cambridge University Press, 2003. . Online .
 Adjective Classes: A Cross-Linguistic Typology (Editor with A. Y. Aikhenvald), 2006
 Complementation: A Cross-Linguistic Typology (Editor with A. Y. Aikhenvald), 2006
 Serial Verb Constructions: A Cross-Linguistic Typology (Editor with A. Y. Aikhenvald), 2007. Here at Google Books.
 Grammars in Contact: A Cross-Linguistic Typology (Editor with A. Y. Aikhenvald), 2007
 The Semantics of Clause Linking: A Cross-Linguistic Typology (Editor with A. Y. Aikhenvald), 2009. Here at Google Books.
 Possession and Ownership (Editor with A. Y. Aikhenvald), 2013
 The Grammar of Knowledge: A Cross-Linguistic Typology (Editor with A. Y. Aikhenvald), 2014
 The Cambridge Handbook of Linguistic Typology. Editor with A. Y. Aikhenvald. Cambridge: Cambridge University Press, 2017. . Online .
 Commands: A Cross-Linguistic Typology (Editor with A. Y. Aikhenvald), 2017
 Non-Canonical Marking of Subjects and Objects. Editor with A. Y. Aikhenvald and Masayuki Onishi.

References:

Pseudonymous publications
During the 1960s, Dixon published two science-fiction short stories under the name of Simon Tully, and in the 1980s two detective novels under the name of Hosanna Brown.

Notes

References

Living people
1939 births
People educated at Nottingham High School
Academic staff of James Cook University
People from Gloucester
People from Stroud
People from Bramcote
Punctuated equilibrium
Discographers
Australian memoirists
Linguists from Australia
Linguists from England
21st-century linguists
Paleolinguists
Linguists of Tasmanian languages
Linguists of Pama–Nyungan languages
Linguists of Arawan languages
Linguists of Fijian